The 2015–16 Charlotte Hornets season was the 26th season of the franchise in the National Basketball Association (NBA) and the fourth season under head coach Steve Clifford. With 48–34 record, the Hornets qualified for the playoffs for the tenth time in Charlotte pro basketball history as a sixth seed, where they played the third-seeded Miami Heat. In a tight playoff match, the Hornets lost the first two games in Miami, before winning three straight. Miami took games 6 and 7, winning the series.

As of 2022, this marked the last season the Hornets made the playoffs.

2015 NBA draft

Roster

Preseason

|- style="background:#bfb;"
| 1
| October 3
| @ Orlando
| 106–100
| Jeremy Lin (17)
| Al Jefferson (9)
| Kemba Walker (8)
| Amway Center14,942
| 1–0
|- style="background:#bfb;"
| 2
| October 4
| @ Miami
| 90–77
| Brian Roberts (21)
| Frank Kaminsky (11)
| Kaminsky, Roberts (3)
| American Airlines Arena19,600
| 2–0
|- style="background:#bfb;"
| 3
| October 11
| L. A. Clippers
| 106–94
| Lin, Zeller (16)
| Spencer Hawes (13)
| Kemba Walker (5)
| Shenzhen Universiade Sports Centre17,376
| 3–0
|- style="background:#bfb;"
| 4
| October 14
| @ L. A. Clippers
| 113–71
| Al Jefferson (17)
| Nicolas Batum (10)
| Nicolas Batum (5)
| Mercedes-Benz Arena15,905
| 4–0
|- style="background:#bfb;"
| 5
| October 17
| New York
| 97–93
| Al Jefferson (12)
| Hansbrough, Kaminsky (8)
| Frank Kaminsky (3)
| Time Warner Cable Arena11,632
| 5–0
|- style="background:#bfb;"
| 6
| October 19
| Chicago
| 94–86
| Kemba Walker (22)
| Jeremy Lin (8)
| Jeremy Lin (5)
| Time Warner Cable Arena8,769
| 6–0
|- style="background:#bfb;"
| 7
| October 21
| @ Detroit
| 99–94
| Batum, Lin (18)
| Nicolas Batum (10)
| Nicolas Batum (6)
| The Palace of Auburn Hills11,096
| 7–0
|- style="background:#fbb;"
| 8
| October 22
| @ Indiana
| 86–98
| Frank Kaminsky (19)
| Hansbrough, Zeller (9)
| Brian Roberts (5)
| Allen County War Memorial Coliseum10,744
| 7–1

Regular season

Game log

|- style="background:#fbb;"
| 1
| October 28
| @ Miami
| 
| Kemba Walker (19)
| Cody Zeller (12)
| Kemba Walker (4)
| American Airlines Arena19,724
| 0–1
|-style="background:#fbb;"
| 2
| October 30
| @ Atlanta
| 
| Nicolas Batum (14)
| Nicolas Batum (12)
| Kemba Walker (6)
| Philips Arena17,024
| 0–2

|-style="background:#fbb;"
| 3
| November 1
| Atlanta
| 
| Kemba Walker (20)
| Al Jefferson (10)
| Nicolas Batum (8)
| Time Warner Cable Arena18,691
| 0–3
|-style="background:#bfb;"
| 4
| November 3
| Chicago
| 
| Jeremy Lamb (20)
| Marvin Williams (10)
| Kemba Walker (5)
| Time Warner Cable Arena15,136
| 1–3
|-style="background:#bfb;"
| 5
| November 5
| @ Dallas
| 
| Al Jefferson (31)
| Marvin Williams (12)
| Kemba Walker (7)
| American Airlines Center19,635
| 2–3
|-style="background:#fbb;"
| 6
| November 7
| @ San Antonio
| 
| Kemba Walker (23)
| Al Jefferson (7)
| Batum, Walker (4)
| AT&T Center18,418
| 2–4
|-style="background:#bfb;"
| 7
| November 10
| @ Minnesota
| 
| Jeremy Lin (19)
| Marvin Williams (10)
| Kemba Walker (6)
| Target Center14,722
| 3–4
|-style="background:#bfb;"
| 8
| November 11
| New York
| 
| Nicolas Batum (24)
| Batum, Jefferson (5)
| Spencer Hawes (5)
| Time Warner Cable Arena16,643
| 4-4
|-style="background:#fbb;"
| 9
| November 13
| @ Chicago
| 
| Nicolas Batum (28)
| Lamb, Walker (9)
| Kemba Walker (7)
| United Center21,749
| 4–5
|-style="background:#bfb;"
| 10
| November 15
| Portland
| 
| Nicolas Batum (33)
| Nicolas Batum (6)
| Marvin Williams (8)
| Time Warner Cable Arena15,317
| 5–5
|-style="background:#fbb;"
| 11
| November 17
| @ New York
| 
| Kemba Walker (31)
| Batum, Lamb (6)
| Lamb, Lin (3)
| Madison Square Garden19,812
| 5–6
|-style="background:#bfb;"
| 12
| November 18
| Brooklyn
| 
| Nicolas Batum (24)
| Lin, Williams (9)
| Nicolas Batum (8)
| Time Warner Cable Arena14,040
| 6–6
|-style="background:#bfb;"
| 13
| November 20
| Philadelphia
| 
| Al Jefferson (26)
| Al Jefferson (10)
| Kemba Walker (7)
| Time Warner Cable Arena17,926
| 7–6
|-style="background:#bfb;"
| 14
| November 23
| Sacramento
| 
| Kemba Walker (39)
| Nicolas Batum (10)
| Nicolas Batum (8)
| Time Warner Cable Arena14,163
| 8–6
|-style="background:#bfb;"
| 15
| November 25
| Washington
| 
| Walker, Batum (16)
| Jefferson, Williams (11)
| Nicolas Batum (11)
| Time Warner Cable Arena17,064
| 9–6
|-style="background:#fbb;"
| 16
| November 27
| Cleveland
| 
| Kemba Walker (18)
| Lamb, Batum (8)
| Batum, Lin, Walker (4)
| Time Warner Cable Arena19,093
| 9–7
|-style="background:#bfb;"
| 17
| November 29
| Milwaukee
| 
| Kemba Walker (22)
| Jeremy Lamb (9)
| Nicolas Batum (5)
| Time Warner Cable Arena14,224
| 10–7

|-style="background:#fbb;"
| 18
| December 2
| Golden State
| 
| Nicolas Batum (17)
| Nicolas Batum (8)
| Brian Roberts (5)
| Time Warner Cable Arena19,542
| 10–8
|-style="background:#bfb;"
| 19
| December 5
| @ Chicago
| 
| Nicolas Batum (24)
| Nicolas Batum (11)
| Batum, Walker (5)
| United Center21,770
| 11–8
|-style="background:#bfb;"
| 20
| December 7
| Detroit
| 
| Cody Zeller (20)
| Marvin Williams (12)
| Nicholas Batum (8)
| Time Warner Cable Arena 15,481
| 12–8
|-style="background:#bfb;"
| 21
| December 9
| Miami
| 
| Walker, Williams (18)
| Nicolas Batum (11)
| Nicolas Batum (11)
| Time Warner Cable Arena17,404
| 13–8
|-style="background:#bfb;"
| 22
| December 11
| @ Memphis
| 
| Kemba Walker (33)
| Kaminsky, Williams (6)
| Kemba Walker (6)
| FedEx Forum17,111
| 14–8
|-style="background:#fbb;"
| 23
| December 12
| Boston
| 
| Nicolas Batum (21)
| Batum, Hawes (8)
| Kemba Walker (4)
| Time Warner Cable Arena18,490
| 14–9
|-style="background:#fbb;"
| 24
| December 16
| @ Orlando
| 
| Jeremy Lamb (16)
| Kaminsky, Lamb, Williams (5)
| Kemba Walker (9)
| Amway Center16,019
| 14–10
|-style="background:#bfb;"
| 25
| December 17
| Toronto
| 
| Jeremy Lin (35)
| Hawes, Williams (10)
| Kemba Walker (7)
| Time Warner Cable Arena15,817
| 15–10
|-style="background:#fbb;"
| 26
| December 19
| @ Washington
| 
| Kemba Walker (18)
| Marvin Williams (9)
| Nicolas Batum (8)
| Verizon Center16,987
| 15–11
|-style="background:#fbb;"
| 27
| December 21
| @ Houston
| 
| Kemba Walker (14)
| Cody Zeller (7)
| Kemba Walker (6)
| Toyota Center18,236
| 15–12
|-style="background:#fbb;"
| 28
| December 23
| Boston
| 
| Frank Kaminsky (23)
| Cody Zeller (10)
| Nicolas Batum (7)
| Time Warner Cable Arena19,082
| 15–13
|-style="background:#bfb;"
| 29
| December 26
| Memphis
| 
| Kemba Walker (22)
| Nicolas Batum (11)
| Batum, Walker (8)
| Time Warner Cable Arena19,091
| 16–13
|-style="background:#bfb;"
| 30
| December 28
| L.A. Lakers
| 
| Kemba Walker (38)
| Marvin Williams (11)
| Nicolas Batum (11)
| Time Warner Cable Arena19,632
| 17–13
|-style="background:#fbb;"
| 31
| December 30
| L.A. Clippers
| 
| Kemba Walker (29)
| Batum, Zeller (8)
| Kemba Walker (7)
| Time Warner Cable Arena19,145
| 17–14

|-style="background:#fbb;"
| 32
| January 1
| @ Toronto
| 
| Kemba Walker (18)
| Cody Zeller (9)
| Nicolas Batum (7)
| Air Canada Centre19,800
| 17–15
|-style="background:#fbb;"
| 33
| January 2
| Oklahoma City
| 
| Kemba Walker (32)
| Marvin Williams (8)
| Kemba Walker (5)
| Time Warner Cable Arena19,387
| 17–16
|-style="background:#fbb;"
| 34
| January 4
| @ Golden State
| 
| Kemba Walker (22)
| Cody Zeller (10)
| Spencer Hawes (4)
| Oracle Arena19,596
| 17–17
|-style="background:#fbb;"
| 35
| January 6
| @ Phoenix
| 
| Kemba Walker (25)
| Cody Zeller (11)
| Kemba Walker (6)
| Talking Stick Resort Arena16,910
| 17–18
|-style="background:#fbb;"
| 36
| January 9
| @ L.A. Clippers
| 
| Jeremy Lin (26)
| Lamb, Zeller (13)
| Jeremy Lin (4)
| Staples Center19,060
| 17–19
|-style="background:#fbb;"
| 37
| January 10
| @ Denver
| 
| Lamb, Zeller (15)
| Jeremy Lamb (8)
| Nicolas Batum (7)
| Pepsi Center11,343
| 17–20
|-style="background:#bfb;"
| 38
| January 13
| Atlanta
|
| Kemba Walker (23)
| Cody Zeller (10)
| Nicolas Batum (10)
| Time Warner Cable Arena 15,334
|18–20
|-style="background:#fbb;"
| 39
| January 15
| @ New Orleans
| 
| Batum, Walker (25)
| Cody Zeller (8)
| Nicolas Batum (8)
| Smoothie King Center16,876
| 18–21
|-style="background:#fbb;"
| 40
| January 16
| Milwaukee
| 
| Jeremy Lin (15)
| Spencer Hawes (9)
| Nicolas Batum (9)
| Time Warner Cable Arena18,288
| 18–22
|-style="background:#bfb;"
| 41
| January 18
| Utah
|
| Kemba Walker (52)
| Batum, Walker (9)
| Kemba Walker (8)
| Time Warner Cable Arena17,459
| 19–22
|-style="background:#fbb;"
| 42
| January 20
| @ Oklahoma City
| 
| Kemba Walker (21)
| Batum, Hawes, Kaminsky (6)
| Frank Kaminsky (4)
| Chesapeake Energy Arena18,203
| 19–23
|-style="background:#bfb;"
| 43
| January 22
| @ Orlando
| 
| Kemba Walker (40)
| Marvin Williams (14)
| Kemba Walker (9)
| Amway Center18,083
| 20–23
|-style="background:#bfb;"
| 44
| January 23
| New York
| 
| Lin, Walker (26)
| Marvin Williams (12)
| Lin, Walker (5)
| Time Warner Cable Arena17,768
| 21–23
|-style="background:#bfb;"
| 45
| January 25
| @ Sacramento
| 
| Troy Daniels (28)
| Frank Kaminsky (8)
| Jeremy Lin (11)
| Sleep Train Arena16,991
| 22–23
|-style="background:#fbb;"
| 46
| January 27
| @ Utah
| 
| Kemba Walker (15)
| Nicolas Batum (10)
| Batum, Hawes (2)
| Vivint Smart Home Arena16,683
| 22–24
|-style="background:#fbb;"
| 47
| January 29
| @ Portland
| 
| Marvin Williams (20)
| Tyler Hansbrough (14)
| Nicolas Batum (8)
| Moda Center19,393
| 22–25
|-style="background:#bfb;"
| 48
| January 31
| @ L.A. Lakers
| 
| Marvin Williams (19)
| Kidd-Gilchrist, Williams (12)
| Kemba Walker (6)
| Staples Center18,997
| 23–25

|-style="background:#bfb;"
| 49
| February 3
| Cleveland
| 
| Jeremy Lin (24)
| Michael Kidd-Gilchrist (13)
| Jeremy Lin (8)
| Time Warner Cable Arena19,189
| 24–25
|-style="background:#fbb;"
| 50
| February 5
| Miami
| 
| Marvin Williams (27)
| Cody Zeller (8)
| Nicolas Batum (7)
| Time Warner Cable Arena19,147
| 24–26
|-style="background:#bfb;"
| 51
| February 6
| Washington
| 
| Nicolas Batum (26)
| Nicolas Batum (11)
| Nicolas Batum (9)
| Time Warner Cable Arena18,450
| 25–26
|-style="background:#bfb;"
| 52
| February 8
| Chicago
| 
| Kemba Walker (30)
| Nicolas Batum (13)
| Batum, Walker (8)
| Time Warner Cable Arena15,886
| 26–26
|-style="background:#bfb;"
| 53
| February 10
| @ Indiana
| 
| Kemba Walker (25)
| Cody Zeller (11)
| Nicolas Batum (6)
| Bankers Life Fieldhouse15,653
| 27–26
|- align="center"
|colspan="9" bgcolor="#bbcaff"|All-Star Break
|-style="background:#bfb;"
| 54
| February 19
| @ Milwaukee
| 
| Kemba Walker (25)
| Cody Zeller (9)
| Kemba Walker (4)
| BMO Harris Bradley Center16,370
| 28–26
|-style="background:#bfb;"
| 55
| February 21
| @ Brooklyn
| 
| Kemba Walker (28)
| Marvin Williams (12)
| Nicolas Batum (8)
| Barclays Center16,155
| 29–26
|-style="background:#fbb;"
| 56
| February 24
| @ Cleveland
| 
| Kemba Walker (20)
| Marvin Williams (10)
| Batum, Walker (6)
| Quicken Loans Arena20,562
| 29–27
|-style="background:#bfb;"
| 57
| February 26
| @ Indiana
| 
| Marvin Williams (26)
| Marvin Williams (13)
| Kemba Walker (10)
| Bankers Life Fieldhouse18,165
| 30–27
|-style="background:#fbb;"
| 58
| February 28
| @ Atlanta
| 
| Marvin Williams (16)
| Marvin Williams (9)
| Kemba Walker (5)
| Philips Arena17,156
| 30–28

|-style="background:#bfb;"
| 59
| March 1
| Phoenix
| 
| Kemba Walker (26)
| Nicolas Batum (9)
| Kemba Walker (9)
| Time Warner Cable Arena16,849
| 31–28
|-style="background:#bfb;"
| 60
| March 2
| @ Philadelphia
| 
| Kemba Walker (30)
| Marvin Williams (9)
| Nicolas Batum (7)
| Wells Fargo Center11,143
| 32–28
|-style="background:#bfb;"
| 61
| March 4
| Indiana
| 
| Kemba Walker (33)
| Cody Zeller (11)
| Kemba Walker (10)
| Time Warner Cable Arena19,099
| 33–28
|-style="background:#bfb;"
| 62
| March 7
| Minnesota
| 
| Kemba Walker (34)
| Walker, Williams (7)
| Kemba Walker (6)
| Time Warner Cable Arena15,912
| 34–28
|-style="background:#bfb;"
| 63
| March 9
| New Orleans
| 
| Kemba Walker (35)
| Cody Zeller (8)
| Kemba Walker (7)
| Time Warner Cable Arena16,335
| 35–28
|-style="background:#bfb;"
| 64
| March 11
| Detroit
| 
| Marvin Williams (22)
| Lee, Williams (6)
| Nicholas Batum (11)
| Time Warner Cable Arena18,189
| 36–28
|-style="background:#bfb;"
| 65
| March 12
| Houston
| 
| Kemba Walker (26)
| Al Jefferson (10)
| Nicholas Batum (8)
| Time Warner Cable Arena19,303
| 37–28
|-style="background:#fbb;"
| 66
| March 14
| Dallas
| 
| Kemba Walker (25)
| Cody Zeller (9)
| Kemba Walker (9)
| Time Warner Cable Arena15,686
| 37–29
|-style="background:#bfb;"
| 67
| March 16
| Orlando
| 
| Batum, Williams (26)
| Cody Zeller (13)
| Nicholas Batum (9)
| Time Warner Cable Arena16,148
| 38–29
|-style="background:#bfb;"
| 68
| March 17
| @ Miami
| 
| Jefferson, Walker (21)
| Al Jefferson (10)
| Batum, Walker (7)
| American Airlines Arena19,848
| 39–29
|-style="background:#fbb;"
| 69
| March 19
| Denver
| 
| Nicolas Batum (24)
| Nicolas Batum (8)
| Nicolas Batum (9)
| Time Warner Cable Arena19,271
| 39–30
|-style="background:#bfb;"
| 70
| March 21
| San Antonio
| 
| Jeremy Lin (29)
| Cody Zeller (14)
| Batum, Zeller (3)
| Time Warner Cable Arena18,260
| 40–30
|-style="background:#bfb;"
| 71
| March 22
|@ Brooklyn
| 
| Nicolas Batum (22)
| Frank Kaminsky (7)
| Jefferson, Lin, Walker (4)
| Barclays Center15,739
| 41–30
|-style="background:#fbb;"
| 72
| March 25
| @ Detroit
| 
| Kemba Walker (29)
| Al Jefferson (7)
| Nicholas Batum (7)
| Palace of Auburn Hills17,209
| 41–31
|-style="background:#bfb;"
| 73
| March 26
| @ Milwaukee
| 
| Nicholas Batum (25)
| Marvin Williams (8)
| Nicholas Batum (8)
| BMO Harris Bradley Center15,544
| 42–31
|- style="background:#bfb;"
| 74
| March 29
| @ Philadelphia
| 
| Nicholas Batum (19)
| Nicholas Batum (12)
| Nicholas Batum (12)
| Wells Fargo Center14,486
| 43–31

|- style="background:#bfb;"
| 75
| April 1
| Philadelphia
| 
| Kemba Walker (27)
| Kemba Walker (11)
| Nicholas Batum (7)
| Time Warner Cable Arena19,244
| 44–31
|- style="background:#fbb;"
| 76
| April 3
| @ Cleveland
| 
| Kemba Walker (29)
| Spencer Hawes (9)
| Kemba Walker (7)
| Quicken Loans Arena 20,562
| 44–32
|- style="background:#fbb;"
| 77
| April 5
| @ Toronto
| 
| Jeremy Lin (21)
| Al Jefferson (11)
| Jeremy Lin (7)
| Air Canada Centre19,800
| 44–33
|- style="background:#bfb;"
| 78
| April 6
| @ New York
| 
| Kemba Walker (34)
| Al Jefferson (8)
| Courtney Lee (6)
| Madison Square Garden19,812
| 45–33
|- style="background:#bfb;"
| 79
| April 8
| Brooklyn
| 
| Kemba Walker (22)
| Al Jefferson (9)
| Nicholas Batum (6)
| Time Warner Cable Arena18,337
| 46–33
|- style="background:#fbb;"
| 80
| April 10
| @ Washington
| 
| Frank Kaminsky (18)
| Frank Kaminsky (11)
| Kemba Walker (7)
| Verizon Center19,187
| 46–34
|- style="background:#bfb;"
| 81
| April 11
| @ Boston
| 
| Jeremy Lin (25)
| Al Jefferson (11)
| Kemba Walker (6)
| TD Garden18,624
| 47–34
|- style="background:#bfb;"
| 82
| April 13
| Orlando
| 
| Al Jefferson (26)
| Jeremy Lamb (9)
| Kemba Walker (8)
| Time Warner Cable Arena17,372
| 48–34

Playoffs

Game log

|- style="background:#fbb;"
| 1
| April 17
| @ Miami
| 
| Nicolas Batum (21)
| Cody Zeller (7)
| Jeremy Lin (3)
| American Airlines Arena19,600
| 0–1
|- style="background:#fbb;"
| 2
| April 20
| @ Miami
| 
| Kemba Walker (29)
| Batum, Jefferson (7)
| Batum, Walker (3)
| American Airlines Arena19,650
| 0–2
|- style="background:#bfb;"
| 3
| April 23
| Miami
| 
| Jeremy Lin (18)
| Marvin Williams (14)
| Kemba Walker (7)
| Time Warner Cable Arena19,604
| 1–2
|- style="background:#bfb;"
| 4
| April 25
| Miami
| 
| Kemba Walker (34)
| Spencer Hawes (8)
| Jefferson, Lin (3)
| Time Warner Cable Arena19,156
| 2–2
|- style="background:#bfb;"
| 5
| April 27
| @ Miami
| 
| Marvin Williams (17)
| Marvin Williams (8)
| Jeremy Lin (7)
| American Airlines Arena19,685
| 3–2
|- style="background:#fbb;"
| 6
| April 29
| Miami
| 
| Kemba Walker (37)
| Al Jefferson (7)
| Kemba Walker (5)
| Time Warner Cable Arena19,636
| 3–3
|- style="background:#fbb;"
| 7
| May 1
| @ Miami
| 
| Frank Kaminsky (13)
| Cody Zeller (7)
| Kemba Walker (6)
| American Airlines Arena19,868
| 3–4

Standings

References

Charlotte Hornets seasons
Charlotte Hornets
Charlotte Hornets
Charlotte Hornets